James Reginald Colvin (November 30, 1937 – August 30, 2019) was a former American football defensive tackle in the National Football League (NFL) for the Baltimore Colts, Dallas Cowboys, and New York Giants. He played college football at the University of Houston.

Early years
Colvin attended Lutcher-Stark High School. He accepted a football scholarship from the University of Houston. He was a two-way player and received All-MVC honors in 1959.

Professional career

Baltimore Colts
He was selected in the eighth round (95th overall) of the 1960 NFL Draft. As a rookie, he was moved between offensive guard and defensive tackle. In 1961, he was used as a backup defensive tackle. In 1962, he was named the starter at left defensive tackle, replacing a recently retired Art Donovan.

On July 11, 1964, he was traded to the Dallas Cowboys in exchange for defensive tackle Guy Reese.

Dallas Cowboys
Colvin took over Reese's left defensive tackle starting job, playing alongside Bob Lilly for three years. 

In 1966, he was limited recovering from offseason surgery to repair a ligament injury. At the end of the season, Jethro Pugh was moved from defensive end to left defensive tackle, replacing Colvin in the starting lineup.

After notifying the club of his intentions to retire, he was traded to the Minnesota Vikings, before receiving him back and trading him again on October 11, 1967, to the New York Giants in exchange for a fourth round draft choice (#97-John Douglas).

Minnesota Vikings
Colvin spent a part of the 1967 preseason with the Minnesota Vikings, who were looking to add depth after Carl Eller injured his knee, but was returned to the Cowboys after he couldn't play because of an injured knee.

New York Giants
In 1967, he played 8 games for the New York Giants. On July 22, 1968, he announced his retirement after the Giants did not meet his financial terms.

Personal life
After retiring from football, he owned several car dealerships. He died on August 30, 2019.

References

1937 births
2019 deaths
People from Monahans, Texas
Players of American football from Texas
American football defensive tackles
Houston Cougars football players
Baltimore Colts players
Dallas Cowboys players
New York Giants players